Tanning oil can refer to :

Oils used in leather tanning
 Indoor tanning lotion, oils and lotions that enhance tanning in a tanning bed or outdoors
 Sunscreen, oils and lotions that block ultraviolet sun rays to protect skin from sunburn